Yumi Heo (1964-2016) was an author and illustrator of children's picture books. She was a graduate of San Ji University and the New York School of Visual Arts. In 1989, Heo moved to New York and earned an MFA in Illustration at the New York School of Visual Arts.

Biography

Early life 
Yumi Heo was born in Korea in 1964. Heo began taking art lessons in junior high with the encouragement of her mother.

"Q is for Queens" art installation 
In 1999, Heo designed an art installation called "Q is for Queens." The installation features 30 stained glass windows featuring the landmarks and people of the Queens borough.

Selected works

Writings 

 1994, One Afternoon
 1995, Father’s Rubber Shoes 
 1996, The Green Frogs: A Korean Folktale
 1999, One Sunday Morning
 2009, Ten Days and Nine Nights: An Adoption Story
 2012, Lady Hahn and Her Seven Friends
 2015, Red Light, Green Light

Illustrator 

 1994, The Rabbit’s Judgement (Suzanne Crowder Han, author)
 1995, The Rabbit’s Escape (Suzanne Crowder Han, author)
 1996, The Lonely Lioness and the Ostrich Chicks: A Masai Tale (Verna Aardema, author)
 1997, A is for Asia (Cynthia Chin-Lee, author)
 1998, Pets! (Melrose Cooper, author)
 1998, So Say the Little Monkeys (Nancy Van Laan, author)
 1999, The Not So Itsy-Bitsy Spider: A Pop-up Book 
 2000, Yoshi’s Feast (Kimiko Kamikawa, author), an International Reading Association Teacher's Choice book
 2001, Henry’s First-Moon Birthday (Lenore Look, author), a YASLA notable book
 2001, Sometimes I’m Bombaloo (Rachel Vai), author)
 2002, The Snake’s Tales (Marguerite W. Davol, author)
 2003, Pirican Pic and Pirican Mor (Hugh Lupton, author)
 2004, Smile, Lily! (Candace Fleming, author)
 2004, Moondog (Alice Hoffman and Wolfe Martin, authors)
 2004, Uncle Peter’s Amazing Chinese Wedding (Lenore Look, author)
 2005, Tangerines and Tea, My Grandparents and Me (Ona Gritz, author)
 2008, Jibberwillies at Night (Rachel Vail, author)
 2008, Hey Mr. Choo-choo, Where Are You Going? (Susan Wickberg, author)
 2011, Pola Dot Penguin Pottery (Lenore Look, author)
 2012, Flabbersmashed about You (Rachel Vail, author)

Anthology Contributor 

 2002, This Place I Know: Poems of Comfort (Georgia Head, editor)
 2007, Knock, Knock!

References

External links 
 Official website

1964 births
2016 deaths
American people of Korean descent
American children's book illustrators
American women illustrators
21st-century American women